Dick Thompson Morgan (December 6, 1853 – July 4, 1920) was a U.S. Representative from Oklahoma.

Early life and education
Born at Prairie Creek, Indiana, a few miles southwest of Terre Haute, Indiana, Morgan attended the country schools and the Prairie Creek High School.  In 1876 he received a bachelor's degree and in 1878 a master's degree both from Union Christian College, Merom, Indiana. He became a professor of mathematics in that college. He then graduated from Central Law School, Indianapolis, Indiana, in 1880.

Career
Morgan was admitted to the bar in 1880 and commenced practice in Terre Haute, Indiana. Morgan served as member of the Illinois House of Representatives in 1880 and 1881. He was appointed register of the United States land office at Woodward in Oklahoma Territory, by President Theodore Roosevelt in 1904 and served until May 1, 1908.

Morgan was elected as a Republican to the Sixty-first and to the five succeeding Congresses. Beginning on March 3, 1909, he represented the 2nd district. In 1915, after redistricting due to the 1910 Census, he represented the 8th congressional district until his unexpected death in 1920. He was once known as the "father of the Federal Trade Commission." Morgan introduced the first bill to establish such a commission on January 12, 1912, made the first speech on the House floor urging its adoption on February 21, 1912 and reintroduced a slightly amended version of the bill in 1913. He was a member of the Claims, Railways and Canals, Expenditures in the Treasury Department, Public Lands, and Judiciary committees. Morgan also became an expert on Rural Credits, sponsoring the 1916 rural credits law that created the federal land bank system.

Personal life and death
In 1878 he married Ora Heath. Their son, Porter Heath Morgan, was born in 1880.

On July 4, 1920, Morgan died of pneumonia in Danville, Illinois, while returning from Washington, D.C. to Oklahoma. Dick Thompson Morgan is interred in Rose Hill Burial Park in Oklahoma City, Oklahoma.

Publications
Morgan's Digest of Oklahoma Statutes and Supreme Court Decisions (1897)
Morgan's Manual of the United States Homestead, Township, and Mining Laws (1900)
Morgan's School Land Manual (1901)
Land Credits: A Plea for the American Farmer (1915)
 Served as President and Treasurer of the Western Investment Co. (El Reno, Oklahoma 1901-1904), the publisher of the periodical Oklahoma Real Estate Register.

See also
List of United States Congress members who died in office (1900–49)

References

Dick T. Morgan Collection at the Carl Albert Center
Dick T. Morgan, late a representative from Oklahoma, Memorial addresses delivered in the House of Representatives and Senate frontispiece 1922

1853 births
1920 deaths
People from Vigo County, Indiana
American people of Welsh descent
Republican Party members of the United States House of Representatives from Oklahoma